Exocarpos cupressiformis, with common names that include native cherry, cherry ballart, and cypress cherry, belongs to the sandalwood family of plants. It is a species endemic to Australia. Occasionally the genus name is spelt "Exocarpus" but it appears to be mostly no longer in use.

Description
The cherry ballart superficially resembles the cypress. There are no authoritative published accounts of its host plants or parasitism, the following notes are based on anecdotal accounts. In the early stages of development especially, and like many other members of the Santalaceae, the plants are hemiparasitic on the roots of other trees, particularly Eucalyptus – hence the usefulness of shallow soils to establish this parasitism. More mature plants are less reliant on this parasitism once photosynthesis in their stems is well established. The leaves are reduced to small scales; the green, drooping stems are the site of photosynthesis. Its inconspicuous flowers are arranged in clusters on short spikes 3–6 mm long. Only one flower on each spike eventually forms a fruit. The inedible fruit is a globular, hard, greenish nut, 4-6mm long, containing one seed. It is found on top of a short stalk, the pedicel. As the fruit develops the stalk swells to 5-6mm in diameter and turns yellow or red, to form the edible "cherry" (which lacks the hard stone of a European cherry).

The true, seed-like fruit (actually a nut containing the seed, like the acorn) is found on the outside of the fleshy false "fruit" (actually a swollen pedicel), hence the original name Exocarpos, from the Latin meaning outside fruit.

Habitat
Plants are found in sclerophyll forest, especially in shallow soils, and on granite outcrops in eastern Australia. Their extensive habitat range is from Queensland to Victoria, from the coast to the leeward fringe of the Great Dividing Range, and Tasmania. In more southerly parts of South Australia plants are found in a number of isolated pockets of forest including in a band from the Mount Lofty Ranges, down the Fleurieu Peninsula to Kangaroo Island, in the southern parts of the Yorke Peninsula and the Eyre Peninsula and in the Mount Remarkable National Park area.

The foliage is anecdotally reported to be toxic to stock, however authoritative sources make no mention of such toxicity, and the browse lines (see photo) indicate it is readily consumed by herbivores.

Uses
Indigenous Australians used the wood of the plant to make spearthrowers as well as bull roarers.

The pale wood is very fine-grained with little figure but often striking colour variation. The timber was historically used for making furniture, gun-stocks, and tool handles. It is also suitable for carving and turning and so is also now used for producing decorative and ornamental pieces of art-work in the Arts and Crafts industries.

The fleshy pedicel, the "cherry", is edible and so was used as food by indigenous Australians and by early European settlers. The "fruit" is picked when it is so ripe it is ready to fall from the tree. It may be eaten raw, or cooked.

The 1889 book 'The Useful Native Plants of Australia’ records that Indigenous Australians in Queensland referred to this plant as "Tchimmi-dillen" or "Coo-yie" and that "The fruit is edible. The nut is seated on the enlarged succulent pedicel. This is the poor little fruit of which so much has been written in English descriptions of the peculiarities of the Australian flora. It has been likened to a cherry with the stone
outside (hence the vernacular name) by some imaginative person."

Early European settlers used branches as Christmas trees.

Dispersal and propagation
Dispersal of the species is by birds attracted to the colourful pedicel to which the nut is attached. The digestive juices of the bird weaken the hard nut, allowing the internal seed to germinate more easily Propagation of the species has proved to be difficult.

Gallery

See also
Hovenia dulcis

References

External links
Yarra Ranges
Australian Native Plant Society
Downing Herbarium
Australian Plants Online

Bushfood
cupressiformis
Flora of the Australian Capital Territory
Flora of New South Wales
Flora of Queensland
Flora of South Australia
Flora of Tasmania
Flora of Victoria (Australia)